Tiger Temple, or Wat Pha Luang Ta Bua Yanasampanno, was a Theravada Buddhist temple in the Sai Yok District of Thailand's Kanchanaburi Province in the west of the country. It was founded in 1994 as a forest temple and sanctuary for wild animals, among them tigers, mostly Indochinese tigers. A "commercial" temple, Tiger Temple charged an admission fee.

The temple has been accused by animal rights activists of mistreating the tigers for commercial gain and even trafficking some of its animals, though in 2005 it was cleared of allegations of animal mistreatment in an investigation by wildlife officials and a raid by Thai soldiers. Charges were pressed for unlicensed possession of 38 protected birds found on the temple grounds.

In May 2016, the Thailand Wildlife Conservation Office (WCO) began capturing and relocating the tigers, intending to close the facility. Authorities counted 137 tigers on the premises, and the frozen bodies of 40 cubs, some of them dead for more than five years.

The tigers 

In 1999, the temple received its first tiger cub, one that had been found by villagers. It died soon after. Later, several tiger cubs were given to the temple. As of January 2016, the number of tigers confined at the temple exceeded 150.

The original eight tigers brought to the temple were rescues, and thus far DNA data is incomplete and therefore unavailable to the public, as the pedigree of the tigers is not entirely known. However, it is presumed that they are Indochinese tigers, except Mek, a Bengal tiger. It is possible that some may be the newly discovered Malayan tigers, as well as cross breeds or hybrids.

Issues, reports, and controversy 

Critics charged that the Tiger Temple is a criminal organization. An NGO, Care for the Wild International, claimed that based on information collected between 2005 and 2008, the Tiger Temple is involved in clandestine exchange of tigers with the owner of a tiger farm in Laos, contravening the Convention on International Trade in Endangered Species (CITES) and laws of Thailand and Laos. It charged the temple with operating as a tiger breeding facility without having a license as required under the Thai Wild Animals Reservation and Protection Act of 1992.

According to Edwin Wiek, founder of Wildlife Friends of Thailand, the temple's operations violate CITES, an international treaty on wildlife to which Thailand is a signatory, which bans commercial breeding of protected wild animals such as tigers. All previous attempts by authorities to remove the tigers from Wat Pha Luang Ta Bua Yanasampanno have failed, including one in May 2015. Wiek believes this is due to the influence wielded by the temple and its abbot, Phra Wisutthisarathen.

Based on the Care for the Wild International report, a coalition of 39 conservation groups, including the Humane Society International, the Association of Zoos and Aquariums, World Animal Protection, and the World Wide Fund for Nature, sent a letter to the director general of National Parks of Thailand under the name "The International Tiger Coalition". The letter urged the director general to take action against the Tiger Temple over its import and export of 12 tigers with Laos, its lack of connection with accredited conservation breeding programs, and to genetically test the tigers at the Tiger Temple to determine their pedigree and value to tiger conservation programs. It concludes that the temple does not have the facilities, the skills, the relationships with accredited zoos, or even the desire to manage its tigers in an appropriate fashion. Instead, it is motivated purely by profit.

In December 2006, ABC News spent three days at the temple and did not see any evidence of drugging or mistreating the animals. Both Thai and Western employees who were interviewed claimed that the animals were well-treated. The abbot of the monastery stated that the eventual goal was to breed tigers for release into the wild.

In 2014, Care for the Wild International called for an end to "tiger selfies" in a global campaign coinciding with International Tiger Day. The charity's CEO, Philip Mansbridge, was quoted as saying: "I know people will immediately think we're overreacting or just out to spoil people's fun. But the reality is, one quick pic for you means a lifetime of suffering for that animal." The charity estimates that there are up to 60 incidents a year (of varying severity) of captive tigers mauling tourists or volunteers at places like Tiger Temple.

On 2 February 2015, an investigation of the temple commenced by forest officials. After initially being rebuffed, they returned the following day with a warrant, police, and soldiers. They seized protected wild birds and impounded the tigers on the premises. The head of the Wildlife Crime Suspension office stated the park did not have the proper permits for raising the birds. The tigers were impounded pending further investigation into the tigers' documentation.

In January and May 2016, two reports spanning nine years of investigations were released by the Australian organisation Cee4life (Conservation and Environmental Education 4 Life) The first Cee4life report contains CCTV, recordings, and witness statements regarding the disappearance of tigers at Tiger Temple. The second report contains evidence of tiger body part sales, gifting and international transport. National Geographic alleged that the Buddhist monks there are operating a for-profit breeding, sales, and exploitation business with the tigers at the temple. The following May, Thai authorities began seizing animals and attempting to shut down the facility.  Breeding of tigers for commercial use or otherwise is prohibited by the CITES Convention, and tigers (being endangered) are regarded as state property in Thailand.

In late-May 2016, police and wildlife officials began an operation to remove all living tigers at Tiger Temple. During the operation, officials found over 40 tiger cub corpses as well as numerous body parts from other animals preserved in freezers. According to a representative of the Department of National Parks, the tiger cubs had died only a short time before the raid. The temple, however, had not reported the birth of any tigers for months. This was seen as a sign for hidden illegal breeding. Some twelve living hornbills were also confiscated as being possessed without a license. The abbot's secretary was stopped from leaving the site with over 1000 amulets containing pieces of tiger skin, two whole tiger skins, and nine or ten tiger fangs. He and four other persons are investigated for alleged wildlife smuggling. The temple was closed to the public at the beginning of the raid. On 3 June, another thirty carcasses of tiger cubs were found in containers with English-language labels, suggesting that they might have been for sale. Since its founding in 1994, the temple has profited greatly from tourism while billing itself as a spiritual organization dedicated to wildlife conservation.

References

External links

 

Animal cruelty incidents
Buddhist temples in Kanchanaburi Province
Religious organizations established in 1994
Thai Theravada Buddhist temples and monasteries
Animals in Buddhism